Slokar is a surname. Notable people with the surname include:

 Andreja Slokar (born 1997), Slovenian alpine ski racer
 Uroš Slokar (born 1983), Slovenian basketball player

Slovene-language surnames